Audrey Ngaere Gale  (née Eberlet, 17 March 1909 – 27 July 1992) was a New Zealand lawyer, local politician and community leader. She was born in New Plymouth, New Zealand, on 17 March 1909.

In the 1979 Queen's Birthday Honours, Gale was appointed an Officer of the Order of the British Empire, for services to the community.  In 1989 Merrilands Domain in New Plymouth was named Audrey Gale Reserve as recognition of her service to the city and its parks and reserves.

References

1909 births
1992 deaths
20th-century New Zealand lawyers
People from New Plymouth
New Zealand Officers of the Order of the British Empire
20th-century New Zealand politicians
20th-century New Zealand women politicians
New Zealand National Party politicians
New Zealand city councillors